Arcasio Ricci (1590–1636) was a Roman Catholic prelate who served as Bishop of Gravina di Puglia (1630–1636).

Biography
Arcasio Ricci was born in 1590 in Pescia, Italy.
On 13 Nov 1630, he was appointed during the papacy of Pope Urban VIII as Bishop of Gravina di Puglia.
On 24 Nov 1630, he was consecrated bishop by Antonio Marcello Barberini (seniore), Cardinal-Priest of Sant'Onofrio, with Giovanni Battista Scanaroli, Titular Bishop of Sidon, and Ulderico Carpegna, Bishop of Gubbio, serving as co-consecrators.
He served as Bishop of Gravina di Puglia until his death on 8 Feb 1636 in Gravina, Italy.

References

External links and additional sources
 (for Chronology of Bishops) 
 (for Chronology of Bishops) 

17th-century Italian Roman Catholic bishops
Bishops appointed by Pope Urban VIII
1590 births
1636 deaths